East and West (German: Ost und West) is a 1923 Austrian silent drama film directed by Ivan Abramson and Sidney M. Goldin and starring Molly Picon, Jacob Kalich and Sidney M. Goldin. It is also known by the alternative title of Good Luck.

Cast
 Molly Picon as Mollie 
 Jacob Kalich as Jacob Talmudist aka Ben Ali 
 Sidney M. Goldin as Morris Brownstein aka Brown 
 Laura Glucksman as Grandmother Brownstein 
 Eugen Neufeld as Alfred Freed 
 Johannes Roth
 Ida Astori
 Sigi Hofer
 Saul Nathan
 Eugen Preiß
 Nelly Spodek

References

Bibliography
 Judith N. Goldberg. Laughter through tears: the Yiddish cinema. Fairleigh Dickinson University Press, 1983.

External links

1923 films
Austrian silent feature films
Films directed by Ivan Abramson
Films directed by Sidney M. Goldin
Austrian black-and-white films
Films about Jews and Judaism